The Northeastern Minnesota Book Awards, or the NEMBA Awards, are awards presented annually for books that "substantially represent northeastern Minnesota in the areas of history, culture, heritage, or lifestyle."

The awards, originally established in 1988, are organized by the University of Minnesota, Duluth Library, with assistance from the Friends of the Duluth Public Library and Lake Superior Writers. To be eligible for an award, books must be about the region (defined as a nine-county area) but need not be written by local authors. Prizes are currently awarded in six categories: General Nonfiction, Fiction, Art & Photography, Children's Literature, Poetry, and Memoir and Creative Nonfiction.

Winners
 1988 - Quiet Magic by Sam Cook 
 1989 - The Winter Room by Gary Paulsen
 1990 - Gunflint: Reflections on the Trail by Justine Kerfoot 
 1991 - North Writers: A Strong Woods Collection edited by John Henricksson 
 1992 - The Grand Portage Story by Carolyn Gilman
 1993 - Walking the Rez Road by Jim Northrup
 1994 - The Illustrated Voyageur by Howard Sivertson 
 1995 - The Duluth Portfolio by Craig and Nadine Blacklock 
 1996 - Silent Words by Joan M. Drury 
 1997 - Just Above Water by Louis Jenkins
 1998 - Cold Comfort by Barton Sutter
 1999 - 50 Circuit Hikes by Howard Fenton
 2000 - John Blair and the Great Hinckley Fire by Josephine Nobisso 
 2001 – Schooners, Skiffs & Steamships: Stories along Lake Superior Water Trails by Howard Sivertson 
 2002
Fiction, Poetry, Drama: Borealis by Jeff Humphries with woodcut prints by Betsy Bowen 
Nonfiction, Art, Scholarship: The Art of the Canoe with Joe Seliga by Jerry Stelmok with photography by Deborah Sussex 
 2003
Fiction, Poetry, Drama: Uncommon Light: A Collection of Poems by Jeanine Lamoureux Emmons, Gladys Koski Holmes, Kathleen McQuillan, Stephanie Stevens, and Sheila Packa 
Nonfiction, Art, Scholarship: V Is for Viking: A Minnesota Alphabet by Kathy-jo Wargin, illustrated by Karen Latham and Rebecca Latham
 2004
Fiction, Poetry, Drama: Ojibwe Tales: Stories of the Ojibwe People by Art Przybilla with the aid of the late Randy Councillor 
Nonfiction, Art, Scholarship: Minnesota's Iron Country: Rich Ore, Rich Lives by Marvin Lamppa 
 2005
Fiction, Poetry, Drama: Zoe's Good-bye written and illustrated by Mary Schlangen 
Nonfiction, Art, Scholarship: Salmela: Architect by Thomas Fisher, with photographs by Peter Bastianelli-Kerze 
 2006
Fiction, Poetry, Drama: The North Shore written by Gunnard Landers 
Nonfiction, Memoir: Waking: A Memoir of Trauma and Transcendence written by Matthew Sanford 
Children's Literature: Fearless John: The Legend of John Beargrease written by Kelly Emerling Rauzi and illustrated by Mila Horak 
 2007
Fiction, Poetry, Drama: Thunder Bay: A Cork O'Connor Mystery written by William Kent Krueger
Nonfiction, Memoir: Morgan Park: Duluth, U.S. Steel, and the Forging of a Company Town written by Arnold R. Alanen 
Children's Literature: Agate: What Good is a Moose? written by Joy Morgan Dey and illustrated by Nikki Johnson
Art, Photography : Celebrating Birch: The Lore, Art, and Craft of an Ancient Tree written by North House Folk School 
 2008
Fiction: A Finntown of the Soul written by Patricia Eilola 
Poetry: Trail Guide to the Northland Experience in Prints and Poetry by Northern Printmakers Alliance and Lake Superior Writers 
General Nonfiction: Hard Work and a Good Deal: The Civilian Conservation Corps in Minnesota written by Barbara W. Sommer 
Children's Literature: Someone Walks By: The Wonders of Winter Wildlife written by Polly Carlson-Voiles 
Art, Photography: Driftwood: Stories Picked Up along the Shore written by Howard Sivertson 
Memoir and Creative Nonfiction: Overburden: Modern Life on the Iron Range written by Aaron Brown 
 2009
Fiction: Minnesota Coldwritten by Cynthia Kraack
Poetry: The Dark Honey: New & Used Poems by Ellie Schoenfeld
General Nonfiction: Minong - The Good Place: Ojibwe and Isle Royale written by Timothy Cochrane
Children's Literature: WIntering written by William Durbin
Memoir and Creative Nonfiction: Knife Island written by Stephen Dahl
 2010
Fiction: Safe from the Sea written by Peter Geye
Poetry: On Speaking Terms by Connie Wanek
General Nonfiction: Paddle North: Canoeing the Boundary Waters-Quetico Wilderness written by Greg Breining, photography by Layne Kennedy
Children's Literature: Minnesota's Hidden Alphabet written by David LaRochelle, photography by Joe Rossi
Memoir and Creative Nonfiction: Brown Sugar Syrup and Jack Pine Sand  written by Dennis Herschbach
 2011
Fiction: Dead Ahead: A Jo Spence Mystery written by Jen Wright
Poetry: Tumbled Dry by Charmaine Donovan
General Nonfiction: Ancient Earth and the First Ancestors: A Cultural and Geological Journey written by Ron Morton and Carl Gawboy, illustrated by Carl Gawboy
Children's Literature: Unforgettable written by Loretta Ellsworth
Art, Photography: Voyageur Skies: Weather and the Wilderness in Minnesota's National Park  photography by Don Breneman, weather commentary by Mark Seeley
Memoir and Creative Nonfiction: Shelter written by Sarah Stonich
 2012
Fiction: The Lighthouse Road written by Peter Geye
Poetry: The First Day of Spring in Northern Minnesota by Jim Johnson
General Nonfiction: Hawk Ridge: Minnesota's Birds of Prey written by Laura Erickson, illustrated by Betsy Bowen
Children's Literature: Summer of the Wolves written by Polly Carlson-Voiles
Art, Photography: Another Year on the Gunflint Trail by Nace Hagemann
Memoir and Creative Nonfiction: My Mother Is Now Earth written by Mark Anthony Rolo
 2013
Fiction: Tamarack County written by William Kent Krueger
Poetry: Bound Together: Like the Grasses by Deborah Cooper, Candace Ginsberg, Ann Floreen Niedringhaus, Ellie Schoenfeld, Anne Simpson
General Nonfiction: The Pie Place Cafe Cookbook: Food & Stories Seasoned by the North Shore written by Kathy Rice
Children's Literature: The Best Part of a Sauna written by Sheryl Peterson, illustrated by Kelly Dupre
Memoir and Creative Nonfiction: Threads of Hope: Caring for Babies Across Three Continents written by Martha Aas, M.D.
 2014
Fiction: Sins of Our Fathers, written by Shawn Lawrence Otto
Poetry: Approaching the Gate, by Lynette Reini-Grandell
General Nonfiction: Twin Ports by Trolley: The Streetcar Era in Duluth-Superior, written by Aaron Isaacs
Children's Literature: Rhoda's Rock Hunt, written by Molly Beth Griffin, illustrated by Jennifer A. Bell
Memoir and Creative Nonfiction: Rooted in Iron and Ice: Innocent Years on the Mesabi, written by Gary W. Barfknecht
Art, Photography: Saved by Beauty: Sister Mary Charles McGough, OSB, written by John Schifsky, Sister Lois Eckes, Peter Spooner, Dustin Lyon and Meridith Schifsky
 2015
Fiction: Once Were Mountains written by Victoria Richards
Poetry: Yoik by Jim Johnson
Nonfiction: Taconite Dreams: The Struggle to Sustain Mining on Minnesota's Iron Range, 1915-2000 written by Jeffrey T. Manuel
Children's Literature: Wilder's Ghost written by Diane Bradley
Memoir: Hillsider: Snapshots of a Curious Political Journeywritten by Don Ness
Art, Photography: The Way of Cheng-Khee Chee: Paintings 1974-2014 curated by Peter Spooner, The Tweed Museum of Art
 2016
Fiction: Wintering written by Peter Geye
Poetry: The Sky Watched: Poems of Ojibwe Lives by Linda LeGarde Grover
Nonfiction: What Should A Clever Moose Eat? Natural History, Ecology, and the North Woods written by John Pastor
Children's Literature: One North Star: A Counting Book written by Phyllis Root, illustrated by Betsy Bowen and Beckie Prange
Memoir: Homemade: Finnish Rye, Feed Sack Fashion, and Other Simple Ingredients from My Life in Food written by Beatrice Ojakangas
Art, Photography: Glensheen: The Official Guide to Duluth's Historic Congdon Estate by Tony Dierckins, photography by Dennis O'Hara

Other Minnesota literary awards
Since 1988, the Minnesota Fantasy Award has been presented annually to a person or persons with ties to Minnesota in recognition of their contributions to the fields of fantasy, science fiction and horror.

Also, since 1988, the Minnesota Book Awards are presented annually for books created by writers, illustrators or book artists who are Minnesotans.

References

External links
Official website

American literary awards
Minnesota culture
Awards established in 1988
1988 establishments in Minnesota